Matthias Brändle (born 7 December 1989) is an Austrian professional road bicycle racer, who currently rides for UCI WorldTeam . Brändle is a seven-time winner of the Austrian National Time Trial Championships (2009, 2013, 2014, 2016, 2019, 2020 and 2021), and also won the Austrian National Road Race Championships in 2016.

Career
In 2014, Brändle won two consecutive stages of the Tour of Britain.

In October 2014, he followed in the footsteps of his agent Tony Rominger by setting a new hour record, breaking the month-old record set by 43-year-old Jens Voigt under new regulations introduced by the UCI in June 2014 allowing the use of modern track pursuit racing bicycles. The record stood until 8 February 2015 when it was broken by Australian rider Rohan Dennis.

He was named in the start list for the 2015 Tour de France. He won the Austrian National Road Race Championships in 2016.

Major results

2007
 1st  Overall Trofeo Karlsberg
1st Stage 1
 1st  Overall Tour de Haute-Autriche
1st Stages 2 & 3
2008
 2nd Time trial, National Under-23 Road Championships
 2nd Overall Tour de Berlin
 3rd Züri-Metzgete
 4th Chrono Champenois
 7th Overall Grand Prix Guillaume Tell
 9th Overall Cinturón a Mallorca
 10th Overall Thüringen Rundfahrt der U23
2009
 National Road Championships
1st  Time trial
1st  Under-23 time trial
 3rd Eschborn–Frankfurt City Loop U23
 5th Overall Tour of Hainan
 5th Overall Thüringen Rundfahrt der U23
 5th Rund um Köln
 9th Road race, UCI Road World Under-23 Championships
2010
 1st GP Judendorf–Strassengel
 8th Overall Tour de Langkawi
2011
 1st  Sprints classification, Tour de Romandie
2012
 1st Grote Prijs Stad Zottegem
 1st Stage 2b (TTT) Settimana Internazionale di Coppi e Bartali
 5th Giro dell'Appennino
 9th Rund um Köln
2013
 1st  Time trial, National Road Championships
 1st  Sprints classification, Tour de Romandie
 1st  Mountains classification, Tour de l'Ain
 1st Tour du Jura
 2nd Polynormande
 4th Overall Tour de Luxembourg
1st  Young rider classification
 4th Cholet-Pays de Loire
 4th Tour de Berne
2014
 World Hour record: 51.852 km
 National Road Championships
1st  Time trial
4th Road race
 1st Tour de Berne
 Tour of Britain
1st Stages 5 & 6
 5th Overall Tour of Belgium
 10th Overall Tour du Poitou-Charentes
2015
 1st Stage 6 Tour of Oman
 1st Prologue Tour of Belgium
 4th Overall Tour de l'Eurométropole
2016
 National Road Championships
1st  Road race
1st  Time trial
2017
 1st Stage 3 (ITT) Tour of Belgium
 1st Stage 4 (ITT) Danmark Rundt
 2nd Time trial, National Road Championships
 2nd Overall Three Days of De Panne
 4th Time trial, UEC European Road Championships
2018
 2nd Time trial, National Road Championships
2019
 1st  Time trial, National Road Championships
 2nd Overall Tour of Estonia
1st Prologue
 3rd Overall Tour of Taihu Lake
1st Prologue
 3rd Duo Normand (with Patrick Gamper)
 7th Overall Okolo Slovenska
 8th Overall Tour Poitou-Charentes en Nouvelle-Aquitaine
2020
 1st  Time trial, National Road Championships
2021
 1st  Time trial, National Road Championships
 1st Stage 1b (TTT) Settimana Internazionale di Coppi e Bartali
2022
 3rd Time trial, National Road Championships

Grand Tour general classification results timeline

References

External links

 
 
 
 
 
 Matthias Brandle at Cycling Base

 
 
 
 

1989 births
Living people
Austrian male cyclists
People from Hohenems
Sportspeople from Vorarlberg